Dirk van Braeckel (born 19 February 1958 in Deinze), is a Belgian car designer. He is known for the designing of various models for Volkswagen Group, especially for the Bentley brand.

Career

Born in Deinze, after leaving school, van Braeckel studied electrical engineering, before joining Ford as an apprentice car designer in Cologne, West Germany. Ford then agreed to sponsor him undertake a degree in car design at the Royal College of Art, London.

On graduation, he joined Audi in 1984, working on external design including the Audi A8 concept and Audi A3. In 1993, Volkswagen Group boss Ferdinand Piëch personally chose him to be the design head for Volkswagen's newly purchased Škoda Auto division, where he revised the entire model line-up, designing the Octavia and Fabia models.

After Volkswagen purchased Bentley in 1998 from Vickers plc, van Braeckel joined the British-based company in August 1999 as Director of Design and Styling. His brief was to design a car that could sell in higher volumes than the $240,000 Bentley Arnage model. Van Braeckel designed the Bentley Continental GT, which in 2004 sold 5,983 units, exceeding forecasts by 62%, and in 2009 the Bentley Mulsanne which was designed by him was launched.

Cars

 Audi A8 concept, 1994
 Audi A3, 1996
 Škoda Octavia, 1996
 Škoda Fabia, 1999
 Škoda Superb, 2001
 Škoda Octavia, 2004
 Bentley Continental GT, 2004
 Bentley Flying Spur, 2005
 Bentley Azure, 2006
 Bentley Brooklands, 2007
 Bentley Mulsanne, 2009
 Bentley EXP 9 F, 2012

Awards

In 2007, van Braeckel was awarded the laureate of Antwerp's Christophe Plantin Prize, which honours Belgian citizens whose cultural, artistic or scientific activities contribute to the country's prestige abroad. In 2008, van Braeckel was awarded the European Automotive Design Award by Designers (Europe).

References

External links

1958 births
Living people
People from Deinze
Alumni of the Royal College of Art
Belgian automobile designers
Volkswagen Group designers
Audi people
Škoda people